Andrei Vlasichev  (born 27 January 1981) is an Uzbek professional football player who plays for Lokomotiv Tashkent, and before for FC Pakhtakor Tashkent in the Uzbek League, FC Baltika Kaliningrad in the Russian First Division and FC Ordabasy the Kazakhstan Premier League.

Vlasichev made 11 appearances for the Uzbekistan national football team.

References

External links
 
 Profile at KLISF
 Заявочный список команд Первой лиги-2011

1981 births
Living people
Uzbekistani footballers
Uzbekistan international footballers
Pakhtakor Tashkent FK players
FC Baltika Kaliningrad players
Expatriate footballers in Russia
Navbahor Namangan players
Association football midfielders